Szewiński  is a Polish masculine surname, its feminine counterpart is Szewińska. Notable people with the surname include:

Andrzej Szewiński (born 1970), Polish volleyball player
Irena Szewińska (1946–2018), Polish sprinter

Polish-language surnames